Tadeusz Krawczyk (born 3 June 1959) is a Polish former racing cyclist. He won the Tour de Pologne 1983.

References

External links

1959 births
Living people
Polish male cyclists
Sportspeople from Poznań